The 1932 United States Senate election in Oklahoma took place on November 8, 1932. Incumbent Democratic Senator Elmer Thomas ran for re-election to a second term. Thomas faced a crowded path to renomination, and only won the Democratic primary following a runoff election with attorney Gomer Smith. On the Republican side, oil magnate Wirt Franklin similarly won the Republican nomination in a runoff election. Thomas overwhelmingly defeated Franklin to win re-election, aided by Democratic presidential nominee Franklin D. Roosevelt's landslide win in Oklahoma over Republican President Herbert Hoover.

Democratic primary

Candidates
 Elmer Thomas, incumbent U.S. Senator
 Gomer Smith, attorney
 R. M. McCool, Chairman of the Oklahoma Democratic Party
 Albert C. Hunt, former Oklahoma Supreme Court Justice
 Lee Wade, Duncan contractor
 Moses E. Harris
 D. O. Witmer, Cardin salesman, druggist

Results

Runoff election results

Republican primary

Candidates
 Wirt Franklin, oil producer
 James A. Harris, former Chairman of the Oklahoma Republican Party
 Ulysses S. Stone, former U.S. Congressman from Oklahoma's 5th congressional district
 R. F. Bingham
 Rexford B. Cragg

Results

Runoff election results

General election

Results

References

Oklahoma
1932
1932 Oklahoma elections